Zarandieh County is in Markazi province, Iran, the northernmost county of the province. The capital of the county is the city of Mamuniyeh. At the 2006 census, the county's population was 57,550 in 15,174 households. The following census in 2011 counted 57,153 people in 16,999 households. At the 2016 census, the county's population was 63,907 in 20,483 households.

Administrative divisions

The population history and structural changes of Zarandieh County's administrative divisions over three consecutive censuses are shown in the following table. The latest census shows two districts, six rural districts, and five cities.

References

 

Counties of Markazi Province